Viridios, or Viridius, is a god of ancient Roman Britain.

Centres of worship

Inscribed stones dedicated to Viridios have been recovered in the Romano-British town of Cavsennae or Cavsennis, now Ancaster, Lincolnshire, in England. So far, Ancaster is the only place where inscriptions to this god have been found.

The Ancaster inscriptions
The first inscribed stone was discovered in 1961 in a grave in Ancaster. Wright (1962) reports the find thus: 

The Latin inscription may be translated in English as: For the god Viridius, Trenico made this arch, donated from his own funds. This stone is now in The Collection Museum in Lincoln.

A second inscribed stone was discovered in 2001 by British Channel 4 Television's archaeological programme Time Team. The stone was discovered as part of a late Roman or early Sub-Roman cist burial, being used as a side slab in the grave. Located near the grave where the first inscribed stone was found, the inscription on this second stone reads:
DIO VRID
SANCT
which has been interpreted as: To the holy god Viridios.

Etymology of the name
The Ancaster inscriptions are in Latin, suggesting that the name of the god is also in Latin. If so, the name is used in the dative form, meaning to (the deity). The nominative form, and therefore the name of the god, would be Viridius or Viridios. Because of the Latin word viridis ('green', 'fresh', 'vigorous'), the simplest etymology proposed is that the god's name derives from this root word and refers to a local, tribal Roman god possessing these characteristics. The Green Man is a well-known pagan mythic personage whose human face sprouting green leaves or vines is found in some medieval churches.

Significant speculation exists as to the possible Celtic origins of the deity. Wright specifically addresses such speculations, but notes that such a connection cannot be affirmatively made as there are no firm historico-linguistic connections in evidence between the modern conception of Viridios as a Celtic deity and the god Viridios referenced on the inscriptions:

Related archaeological evidence
An additional limestone figurative carving, probably used as an altarpiece, was also found near Ancaster and dated to the late Iron Age. The carving depicts a naked man holding an axe, standing beneath an archway.  While no inscriptions appear on the stone, the location of the find near Ancaster, and the features displayed on the god that may depict suggested meanings of the name Viridios ('mighty', 'virile', 'verdant', 'fertile'), have led some to speculate that the altarpiece is a depiction of the god Viridios.

See also
 Green Man
 Viridia gens

References

External links

 

Gods of the ancient Britons
Nature gods